Union Sportive de Tataouine is a football club based in Tataouine, Tunisia.

Founded in 1996 after the union of two biggest football clubs in the city (Tataouine Sportive 1947 and Jeunesse Sportive Rogba 1976), the team's colours are red and blue. The home ground is Stade Nejib Khattab. The 2016–17 season was their first ever in the Tunisian Ligue Professionnelle 1.

External links
 Soccerway

Football clubs in Tunisia